Attorney General Pratt may refer to:

Albert F. Pratt (1872–1928), Attorney General of Minnesota
Charles Pratt, 1st Earl Camden (1714–1794), Attorney General for England and Wales
Daniel Pratt (New York politician) (1806–1884), Attorney General of New York

See also
General Pratt (disambiguation)